Michael Edward "Mike" Johnson (born 27 August 1979) is a male British former field hockey player.

Hockey career
Johnson competed in the 2000 Summer Olympics and in the 2004 Summer Olympics. He represented England and won a bronze medal in the men's hockey, at the 1998 Commonwealth Games in Kuala Lumpur  and made his senior hockey debut aged 18, winning a total of 168 international caps.

Personal life
Johnson was hockey coach at Hampstead and Westminster Hockey Club and Cannock and Olton and West Warwicks. He currently working within Education, teaching at King Edward's School, Birmingham and previously worked at Bablake School and Rugby School.

References

External links

 

1979 births
Living people
British male field hockey players
English field hockey coaches
Olympic field hockey players of Great Britain
Field hockey players at the 2000 Summer Olympics
2002 Men's Hockey World Cup players
Field hockey players at the 2004 Summer Olympics
Commonwealth Games medallists in field hockey
Commonwealth Games bronze medallists for England
Hampstead & Westminster Hockey Club players
Loughborough Students field hockey players
Hampstead & Westminster Hockey Club coaches
Field hockey players at the 1998 Commonwealth Games
Medallists at the 1998 Commonwealth Games